Phaenops is a genus of beetles in the family Buprestidae, containing the following species:

 Phaenops abies (Champlain & Knull, 1923)
 Phaenops aeneola (Melsheimer, 1845)
 Phaenops aerea Ganglbauer, 1886
 Phaenops californica (Van Dyke, 1918)
 Phaenops carolina (Manee, 1913)
 Phaenops caseyi (Obenberger, 1944)
 Phaenops cyanea (Fabricius, 1775)
 Phaenops delagrangei (Abeille de Perrin, 1891)
 Phaenops drummondi (Kirby, 1837)
 Phaenops formaneki (Jakobson, 1913)
 Phaenops fulvoguttata (Harris, 1830)
 Phaenops gentilis (LeConte, 1863)
 Phaenops guttulata (Gebler, 1830)
 Phaenops horni (Obenberger, 1944)
 Phaenops intrusa (Horn, 1882)
 Phaenops knoteki Reitter, 1898
 Phaenops lecontei (Obenberger, 1928)
 Phaenops marmottani (Fairmaire, 1868)
 Phaenops obenbergeri (Knull, 1952)
 Phaenops obtusa (Horn, 1882)
 Phaenops peakischkulensis Alexeev, 1996
 Phaenops piniedulis (Burke, 1908)
 Phaenops sumptuosa (Abeille de Perrin, 1904)
 Phaenops vandykei (Obenberger, 1944)
 Phaenops yang Kubáň & Bílý, 2009
 Phaenops yin Kubáň & Bílý, 2009

References

Buprestidae genera